Altınyayla is a Turkish place name meaning "golden plateau" and may refer to:

 Altınyayla, Burdur, a district of Burdur Province, Turkey
 Altınyayla, Sivas, a district of Sivas Province, Turkey

it:Distretto di Altınyayla